Cree Lake/Crystal Lodge (Midgett Field) Aerodrome  is located adjacent to Crystal Lodge, a fly-in fishing lodge on Cree Lake, Saskatchewan, Canada. The airport is located on Ispatinow Island, the largest island in the lake.

The airstrip was created in the late 1990s with naturally derived clay. This runway is a private airstrip for the use of Crystal Lodge guests; CKS8 is primarily serviced by McMurray Aviation based in Fort McMurray, Alberta.  Crystal Lodge does welcome private pilots and general aviation guests who are looking for their own bush pilot experience; permission & planning is required.

See also 
 List of airports in Saskatchewan
 Cree Lake (Crystal Lodge) Water Aerodrome

References

External links
Page about this airport on COPA's Places to Fly airport directory

Registered aerodromes in Saskatchewan